St. James A.M.E. Church, also known as the St. James Chapel AME Church and St. James Chapel, is a historic African Methodist Episcopal congregation in Cape Girardeau, Missouri. It is noted for its historic church, a one-story, stucco-covered brick building with a rectangular plan and a front facing gable built in 1875.

The church features a central square tower added in 1892, with wide overhanging boxed eaves, a centered round window, and a pyramidal roof  It sits on a raised basement dug in 1926. It is one of two remaining urban African-American churches in Cape Girardeau constructed during the Reconstruction Era. It was listed on the National Register of Historic Places in 2014.

References

African-American history of Missouri
African Methodist Episcopal churches in Missouri
Churches on the National Register of Historic Places in Missouri
Churches completed in 1875
National Register of Historic Places in Cape Girardeau County, Missouri
Churches in Cape Girardeau County, Missouri
Churches in Cape Girardeau, Missouri